St Aubyn's School is a co-educational, independent, preparatory school, situated in Woodford Green, England, with around 500 pupils aged between 3 and 13.

History
The school was founded by James Crump. It began in 1884 as a boys' day and boarding preparatory school opposite Bancroft's School in Woodford Wells, moving to Broomhill Walk in 1893. 
Since 1923 the school has been situated on Bunces Lane, where its main building was once a large private town house called Pyrmont Villa, which later extended into the adjoining parklands. During the Second World War, the school was taken over by the army and the field was used as an army parade ground, during which time the school decamped to Cumberland. The school became a charitable trust in 1975, and became co-educational in 1995.

Performing Arts
The school has a strong commitment to dance, drama and music. It has been awarded the Artsmark Silver award by the Arts Council. There are regular plays, performances and concerts by children of all ages.

Cadet Corps
St Aubyn's is the only preparatory school in Great Britain to have its own Cadet Corps. They parade once a week, go away on an annual camp, and also meet at weekends to work on Fieldcraft, Navigation, Skill at Arms, Signals, Campcraft, and Leadership.

References

1884 establishments in England
Educational institutions established in 1884
Private co-educational schools in London
Private schools in the London Borough of Redbridge